Koo Luam Khen (or Khoo Luan Khen, born 27 March 1951) is a Malaysian former national football player. He participated in the 1972 Munich Olympic Games. He was the former coach of Hong Kong national football team, Hong Kong League team Instant-Dict and Sun Hei. He won "Best Coach of the Year" in Hong Kong Top Footballer Awards 2003 and 2005.

In 2004, he was inducted in Olympic Council of Malaysia's Hall of Fame for 1972 Summer Olympics football team.

In early 2013, Koo coached the Northern Mariana Islands football team in the 2014 AFC Challenge Cup qualification tournament in Nepal.

References

External links

 Koo Luam Khen Interview

1951 births
Living people
Malaysian sportspeople of Chinese descent
Malaysian footballers
Malaysia international footballers
Malaysian football managers
Malaysian expatriate football managers
Hong Kong national football team managers
Expatriate football managers in the Northern Mariana Islands
Northern Mariana Islands national football team managers
Olympic footballers of Malaysia
Footballers at the 1972 Summer Olympics
Seiko SA players
Association footballers not categorized by position
Malaysian expatriate sportspeople in the Northern Mariana Islands